Diary of a Psalmist is the fifth album by Marvin Sapp and his second on Verity Records. The album is mostly live with a few studio recorded tracks.

Track listing

Chart positions

References

2003 albums
Marvin Sapp albums